George Perry (born 1771) was a 19th-century English naturalist, a malacologist.

Perry is known for two natural history works:
Arcana; or the museum of natural history, published monthly from January 1810 to September 1811
Conchology, or the natural history of shells, published in 1811 online

See also
:Category:Taxa named by George Perry (naturalist)

References

 J. H. Gatliff, 1902. Notes on Perry's “Conchology”. Victorian Naturalist 19(5):75-76
 C. Hedley, 1902. On Perry's Australian shells. Proceedings of the Linnean Society of New South Wales 27(1): 24-28
 G. M. Mathews & T. Iredale, 1913. “Perry’s Arcana” – an overlooked work. Victorian Naturalist 29: 7-16
 A. T. Hopwood, 1946. Miscellaneous notes. 1. Perry's ‘Conchology”. Proceedings of the Malacological Society of London 26(6):152-153
 J. Q. Burch, 1958. Perry's Conchology. Minutes of the Conchological Club of Southern California 178: 2-3
 R. I. Johnson, 1970. Perry's Conchology (1811) – more than one edition. Journal of the Society for the Bibliography of Natural History 5(4): 287
 A. J. Kohn, 1986. Type specimens and identity of the described species of Conus. VII. The species described 1810-1820. Zoological Journal of the Linnean Society 86(1): 1-41 [Perry: pp. 2–9]
 R. E. Petit & J. Le Renard, 1990. George Perry's fossil molluscan taxa, published in the ‘Arcana’ (1810-1811). Contributions to Tertiary and Quaternary Geology 27(1): 27-35
 R. E. Petit, 2009. Perry's Arcana. A facsimile edition with a collation and systematic review. Philadelphia, Pennsylvania: Temple University, viii + 568 pp., incl. 84 pls.

External links

George Perry’s molluscan taxa and notes on the editions of his Conchology of 1811, Richard E. Petit (2003)

English naturalists
English entomologists
English malacologists
Teuthologists
1771 births
19th-century deaths
Year of death unknown